Italian verbs have a high degree of inflection, the majority of which follows one of three common patterns of conjugation. Italian conjugation is affected by mood, person, tense, number, aspect and occasionally gender.

The three classes of verbs (patterns of conjugation) are distinguished by the endings of the infinitive form of the verb:
 1st conjugation: -are (amare "to love", parlare "to talk, to speak");
 2nd conjugation: -ere (credere "to believe", ricevere "to receive");
 -arre, -orre and -urre are considered part of the 2nd conjugation, as they are derived from Latin -ere but had lost their internal e after the suffix fused to the stem's vowel (a, o and u);
 3rd conjugation: -ire (dormire "to sleep");
 3rd conjugation -ire with infixed -isc- (finire "to end, to finish").

Additionally, Italian has a number of verbs that do not follow predictable patterns in all conjugation classes, most markedly the present and the absolute past. Often classified together as irregular verbs, their irregularities occur to different degrees, with forms of essere "to be", and somewhat less extremely, avere "to have", the least predictable. Others, such as andare "to go", stare "to stay, to stand", dare "to give", fare "to do, to make", and numerous others, follow various degrees of regularity within paradigms, largely due to suppletion, historical sound change or analogical developments.

The suffixes that form the infinitive are always stressed, except for -ere, which is stressed in some verbs (e.g. vedere  "to see") and unstressed in others (e.g. prendere  "to take"). A few verbs have a contracted infinitive, but use their uncontracted stem in most conjugations. Fare comes from Latin facere, which can be seen in many of its forms. Similarly, dire ("to say") comes from dīcere, bere ("to drink") comes from bibere and porre ("to put") comes from pōnere.

Together with the traditional patterns of conjugation, new classes and patterns have been suggested, in order to include common verbs such as avviare, which exhibit a quite different form and stress pattern.

The present

Present (Il presente)

The present is used for:
events happening in the present
habitual actions
current states of being and conditions
actions planned to occur in the future

 io credo "I believe"
 lei dorme "she sleeps"
Subject pronouns are not obligatory in Italian, and they are normally only used when they are stressed. The conjugation of the verb is normally used to show the subject. 
 credo "I believe"
 credi "you believe" (2nd pers. sing.)
 crede "he/she believes"

The pronoun tu (and corresponding verb forms) is used in the singular towards children, family members and close friends (cf. "thou"), whereas voi is used in the same manner in the plural (cf. "ye"). The pronouns Lei and Loro (though much more commonly just voi) are used towards older people, strangers and very important or respectable people. Note that lei and loro can also mean "she" and "they", respectively.

 Lei va "you are going" (formal)
 tu vai "you are going" (informal)
 vai "you are going" (informal)
 va "you are going" (formal)

The irregular verb essere has the same form in the first person singular and third person plural. 
 sono "I am"/"they are"

The forms vado and faccio are the standard Italian first person singular forms of the verbs andare and fare, but vo and fo are used in the Tuscan dialect.

Similar alternations are found in other verbs: 
 leggo  "I read" vs. leggi  "you read"
 dico  "I say" vs. dici  "you say"
 etc.

The past

Present perfect (Il passato prossimo)
The present perfect is used for single actions or events (stamattina sono andato a scuola "I went to school this morning"), or change in state (si è arrabbiato quando gliel’ho detto "he got angry when I told him that"), contrasting with the imperfect which is used for habits (andavo in bicicletta a scuola ogni mattina "I used to go to school by bike every morning"), or repeated actions, not happening at a specific time (si arrabbiava ogni volta che qualcuno glielo diceva "he got angry every time someone told him that").

The past participle
The past participle is used to form the compound pasts (e.g. ho lavorato, avevo lavorato, ebbi lavorato, avrò lavorato). Regular verbs follow a predictable pattern, but there are many verbs with an irregular past participle. 
 verbs in -are add -ato to the stem: parlato, amato;
 some verbs in -ere add -uto to the stem: creduto;
 verbs in -ire add -ito to the stem: partito, finito;
 other verbs in -ere are irregular, they mutate the stem and add -o, -so, -sto or -tto to the stem: preso  (from prendere), letto  (from leggere), rimasto (from rimanere);
 fare and dire do exactly the same thing: fatto (from fare), detto  (from dire). Compounds from the root -durre similarly have -dotto ;
 venire has venuto and bere has bevuto;
 stare and essere both have stato.

Verbs with avere
All transitive verbs and most intransitive verbs form the present perfect by combining the auxiliary verb avere "to have" in the present tense with the past participle of the transitive verb.

Except with an immediately preceding third person pronominal direct object, the participle always ends in -o. 
 il ragazzo che ho visto "the boy I saw"
 l’ho visto "I saw him"
 ho visto il ragazzo "I saw the boy"
 la ragazza che ho visto "the girl I saw"
 l’ho vista "I saw her"
 ho visto la ragazza "I saw the girl"

Verbs with essere
A small number of intransitive verbs, namely essere itself and verbs indicating motion (venire "to come", andare "to go", arrivare "to arrive", etc.) use the auxiliary verb essere instead of avere. The past participle in this agrees with gender and number of the subject.

When using essere, the past participle agrees in gender and number with preceding third person direct object clitic pronouns, following the same pattern of nouns and adjectives:
-o masculine singular
-a feminine singular
-i masculine plural
-e feminine plural
Reflexive verbs always use essere, and their past participle agrees with the subject or with third person object pronouns, if these precede the verb. 
 mi sono lavato/-a "I washed myself"
 ci siamo visti/-e "we saw each other" 
 si è lavato le gambe "he washed his legs"
 se le è lavate, le gambe "he washed them, his legs"
 ci siamo parlati "we talked to each other"

Imperfect (L’imperfetto)
The Imperfect fuses past tense with imperfective aspect and is used for: 
repeated or habitual actions in the past;
ongoing actions in the past and ongoing actions in the past that are eventually interrupted;
states of being and conditions in the past, including weather, time, age.

The difference between imperfective and perfective aspects can be illustrated clearly with the verb sapere 'to know'. The Italian imperfect expresses being in possession of knowledge in the past, while the perfective expresses the moment of acquiring the knowledge.

Imperfective: Sapevo la verità. 'I knew the truth.'       Perfective: Ho saputo la verità. 'I found out the truth.'

The Imperfect is, in most cases, formed by taking the stem along with the thematic vowel and adding v + the ending of the -are verbs in the present tense (with -amo instead of -iamo). There are no irregular conjugations in the Imperfect except for essere, which uses the stem er- and v appears only in 1st and 2nd person plurals. Verbs with contracted infinitive forms use their full stems, e.g. dicevo (infinitive dire), facevo (infinitive fare), bevevo (infinitive bere),  ponevo (infinitive porre).

loro parlavano "they used to speak"

Absolute past (Il passato remoto)

The Absolute Past has a function distinct from the Present Perfect. It is used for events which are distant from the present and no longer directly affect it (e.g. telling a story), whereas the Present Perfect is used for more recent events which may have a direct impact on the present. The Absolute Past may at all times be replaced with the Present Perfect (but not vice versa). In many areas of Southern Italy, it is still used commonly in spoken language, whereas in Northern-Central Italy and Sardinia it is restricted to written language.

Like the past participle, regular verbs are very predictable, but many verbs (mainly of the second conjugation) are irregular. 
 Regular verbs are formed by taking the stem and the stressed thematic vowel and adding -i, -sti, main stress, -mmo, -ste, and -rono. Verbs in -are have -ò in the third person singular instead of the expected -à:
 amare: amai, amasti, amò, amammo, amaste, amarono
 credere: credei, credesti, credé, credemmo, credeste, crederono
 dormire: dormii, dormisti, dormì, dormimmo, dormiste, dormirono
 Irregular verbs, which are almost exclusively of the second conjugation, have irregular stems to which the endings -i, -e, and -ero are added to form the first-person singular and third-person singular and plural forms, respectively, and, with the exception of venire, which takes the normal third conjugation endings, the second conjugation endings -esti, -emmo, and -este are added to the normal stem to form the second-person singular and first- and second-person plural forms, respectively (dire, bere, fare, and porre use their long stems here, as usual):
 rompere: ruppi, rompesti, ruppe, rompemmo, rompeste, ruppero
 vedere: vidi, vedesti, vide, vedemmo, vedeste, videro
 dire: dissi, dicesti, disse, dicemmo, diceste, dissero
 Some verbs in -ere that follow the regular pattern (-ei, -esti, etc.) have an alternative form in -etti which follows the irregular pattern: 
 credere: credetti (= credei), credesti, credette (= credé), credemmo, credeste, credettero (= crederono)
 Essere is the only verb that is completely irregular in this tense.

Past perfect (Il trapassato prossimo)
Used for activities done prior to another activity (translates to constructions such as "had eaten", "had seen").

The Past Perfect is formed the same as the Present Perfect, but with the auxiliary verb in the Imperfect. 
 amare: avevo amato
 arrivare: ero arrivato/-a

In literary language, an Absolute Perfect exists which uses the Absolute Past of the auxiliaries, and which is used for activities done prior to another activity which is described with the Absolutive Past. This form is known as trapassato remoto.
 amare: ebbi amato
 arrivare: fui arrivato/-a

The future

Future (Il futuro semplice)
The future tense is used for events that will happen in the future. It is formed by adding the forms of avere to the Infinitive (with abbiamo and avete contracted to -emo and -ete respectively). Sometimes the Infinitive undergoes some changes: 
 it always loses its final e;
 verbs in -are end in -er, not in -ar;
 stare, dare, fare however retain star-, dar-, far-;
 most irregular verbs lose the vowel before the last r altogether (e.g. avr- for avere and andr- for andare). Clusters -nr- and -lr- are simplified to -rr (e.g. verr- for venire);
 contracted infinitives are retained (e.g. porr- for porre);
 essere has sar-.

To these, the respective suffixes -ò, -ai, -à, -emo, -ete, -anno are added. Historically speaking, these are derived from the present forms of the verb avere.

Future perfect (Il futuro anteriore)
Used for events that will have happened when or before something else happens in the future.

The Future Perfect is formed the same as the Present Perfect, but with the auxiliary verb in the Future. 
 amare: avrò amato
 arrivare: sarò arrivato/-a

The conditional

Conditional (Il condizionale presente)
Used for:
events that are dependent upon another event occurring;
politely asking for something (like in English, "Could I please have a glass of water?").

The Conditional is formed by taking the root of the Future (i.e. an adapted form of the infinitive) and adding the Absolutive Past forms of avere (with ebbi, avesti, avemmo, aveste contracted to -ei, -esti, -emmo, -este resp.).

Past conditional (Il condizionale passato)
Used:
for events that would, could or should have occurred;
as a prospective past tense, e.g. Non sapevo quando sarei arrivato. “I didn’t know when I would arrive.”

The Conditional Perfect is formed the same as the Present Perfect, but with the auxiliary verb in the Conditional. 
 amare: avrei amato
 arrivare: sarei arrivato/-a

The subjunctive

Present subjunctive (Il congiuntivo presente)
Used for subordinate clauses of the present (il presente) to express opinion, possibility, desire, or doubt.

The Subjunctive is formed:
 for regular verbs in -are, by taking the root and adding -i, -ino for all the singular forms and the third plural respectively;
 for most other regular and semi-regular verbs, by taking the first person singular of the Present Indicative and replacing the final -o with -a, -ano for all the singular forms and the third plural respectively;
 for a few irregular verbs, by taking the first person plural of the Present Indicative and replacing stressed -amo with unstressed -a, -ano for all the singular forms and the third plural respectively;
 for all verbs, the first person plural is identical to the Present Indicative. 
 for all verbs, the second person plural is the first person plural with -te instead of -mo;
The Subjunctive is almost always preceded by the conjunctive word che (or compounds such as perché, affinché, etc.).

Imperfect subjunctive (Il congiuntivo imperfetto)
Used for the subordinate clauses of the Imperfect Indicative or the Conditional.

The Imperfect Subjunctive is formed:
 for regular verbs, by taking the Infinitive and replacing -re with -ssi, -ssi, -sse, -ssimo, -ste, -ssero;
 for contracted verbs, by taking, instead of the Infinitive, the stem plus the thematic vowel;
 the only verbs that form this tense irregularly are essere, fare, stare, dare (these two follow the pattern of verbs in -ere rather than the one of verbs in -are).

Past subjunctive (Il congiuntivo passato)
Used for subordinate clauses of the imperfect indicative or the conditional.

The Subjunctive Perfect is formed the same as the Present Perfect, but with the auxiliary verb in the Subjunctive Present. 
 amare: che abbia amato
 arrivare: che sia arrivato/-a

Pluperfect subjunctive (Il congiuntivo trapassato)
The Subjunctive Pluperfect is formed the same as the Present Perfect, but with the auxiliary verb in the Subjunctive Imperfect. 
 amare: che avessi amato
 arrivare: che fossi arrivato/-a

The imperative

Imperative (L’imperativo)
The imperative is used for giving commands.

The second-person singular Imperative is formed: 
 for regular verbs in -are, by taking the third person singular of the Present (e.g. parla)
 for other regular verbs, by taking the second person singular of the Present (e.g. prendi, parti, finisci)
 for andare, dare, fare, and stare, by taking the second person singular of the Present, either shortened to the vowel before i or not (e.g. va/va’/vai for andare)
 for dire, by shortening the stem to di’
 for a few irregular verbs, by taking the singular form of the Subjunctive and replacing final -a with -i (e.g. vogli for volere)

The polite form of the singular is identical to the Present Subjunctive. Objective personal pronouns are placed before the verb, unlike other forms of the imperative which have these after the verb (e.g. Mi aiuti, per favore! "Please help me!" vs. Aiutami! "Help me!", Se ne vada via. "Please go away." vs. Vattene via! (vattene = va’ + te + ne), etc.).

The first-person plural (used for suggestion, e.g. andiamo "let's go!") is identical to the Present Indicative, but allows for pronominal suffixes (e.g. andiamocene "let's go away" vs. ce ne andiamo "we are going away").

The second-person plural is usually identical to the Present Indicative, but in a few irregular cases to the Present Subjunctive.

The polite plural is identical to the Present Subjunctive.  As with the polite singular, objective personal pronouns come before the verb as opposed to after it.

credi! "believe!"
crediamo! "let's believe!"

Negative imperative
The second person singular uses the infinitive instead of its usual form in the negative, while other forms remain unchanged.

non credere! "don't believe!"

Nominal verb forms

Italian verbs have three additional forms, known as nominal forms, because they can be used as nouns or adjectives, rather than as verbs.
 the past participle (participio passato) has been discussed above
 the present participle (participio presente) is used as an adjective or a noun describing someone who is busy doing something. For example, parlante means "talking" or "someone who is talking":
verbs in -are form the present participle by adding -ante to the stem
verbs in -ere and -ire form the present participle by adding -ente  to the stem
fare, dire, bere, porre use their long stems to form resp. facente, dicente, bevente, ponente
essere has essente (though very rare)
 the gerund (gerundio) is the adverbial form of the present participle, and has a very broad use. For example: parlando can translate to "talking / while talking / by talking / because of one's talking / through talking / …": 
the gerund is identical to the present participle, but with final -te replaced by -do

The gerund can be used in combination with the verb stare to create continuous expressions. These are similar to English continuous expressions (e.g. I am talking) but they are used much less extensively than in English. 
 sto lavorando "I'm working"
 stavo mangiando "I was eating"
Keep in mind that the gerund is an adverb, not an adjective, and so it does not agree in gender and number with anything. The ending is always -o:
 la ragazza sta mangiando "The girl is eating"

Like the imperative, all nominal verb forms (including the infinitive) have their objective personal pronouns suffixed rather than placed before them. 
 mi parla > parlarmi;  (parlatomi); (parlantemi); parlandomi; parlami!
 si pone > porsi; (postosi); (ponentesi); ponendosi; poniti!
 me lo dice > dirmelo;  (dettomelo); (dicentemelo); dicendomelo; dimmelo!
 se ne va via > andarsene via;  (andatosene via); (andantesene via); andandosene via; vattene via!

Irregular verbs

The following list includes some example conjugations for a number of verbs commonly classified as irregular, not sorted by type or degree of irregularity. Verbs derived from others (e.g. apprèndere, comprèndere, sorprèndere, ... from prèndere) and the ones which end in the same way (e.g. stèndere, rèndere, accèndere, ...; compare véndere, which is regular) are formed according to the same conjugation.The list does not include essere, avere, andare, stare, dare and fare, that have already been conjugated throughout the article.

• pr. = present;• ps.p. = past perfect;• ps.r. = past absolute;• f. = future;• sg.pr. = present subjunctive;• sg.impf. = imperfect subjunctive;• imp. = imperative;• pt.pr. = present participle

 affiggere  "to post (up), to stick up": pr. affiggo, affiggi, affigge, affiggiamo, affiggete, affiggono; ps.p. ho affisso; impf. affiggevo; ps.r. affissi, affiggesti; f. affiggerò; sg.pr. che affigga, che affiggiamo; sg.impf. che affiggessi; imp. affiggi!, affigga!, affiggiamo!, affiggete!; pt.pr. affiggente;
 apparire  "to appear": pr. appaio , appari, appare, appariamo, apparite, appaiono; ps.p. sono apparso/-a; impf. apparivo; ps.r. apparvi, apparisti; f. apparirò; sg.pr. che appaia, che appariamo; sg.impf. che apparissi; imp. appari!, appaia!, appariamo!, apparite!; pt.pr. apparente;
 aprire  "to open": pr. apro, apri, apre, apriamo, aprite, aprono; ps.p. ho aperto ; impf. aprivo; ps.r. aprii/apersi , apristi; f. aprirò; sg.pr. che apra, che apriamo; sg.impf. che aprissi; imp. apri!, apra!, apriamo!, aprite!; pt.pr. aprente;
 assumere  "to assume": pr. assumo, assumi, assume, assumiamo, assumete, assumono; ps.p. ho assunto; impf. assumevo; ps.r. assunsi, assumesti; f. assumerò; sg.pr. che assuma, che assumiamo; sg.impf. che assumessi; imp. assumi!, assuma!, assumiamo!, assumete!; pt.pr. assumente;
 bere  "to drink": pr. bevo , bevi, beve, beviamo, bevete, bevono;  ps.p. ho bevuto; impf. bevevo; ps.r. bevvi , bevesti; f. berrò; sg.pr. che beva, che beviamo; sg.impf. che bevessi; imp. bevi!, beva!, beviamo!, bevete!; pt.pr. bevente;
 cadere  "to fall (down)": pr. cado, cadi, cade, cadiamo, cadete, cadono; ps.p. sono caduto/-a; impf. cadevo; ps.r. caddi, cadesti; f. cadrò; sg.pr. che cada, che cadiamo; sg.impf. che cadessi; imp. cadi!, cada!, cadiamo!, cadete!; pt.pr. cadente;
 chiedere  "to ask": pr. chiedo , chiedi, chiede, chiediamo, chiedete, chiedono; ps.p. ho chiesto ; impf. chiedevo; ps.r. chiesi , chiedesti; f. chiederò; sg.pr. che chieda, che chiediamo; sg.impf. che chiedissi; imp. chiedi!, chieda!, chiediamo!, chiedete!; pt.pr. chiedente;
 chiudere  "to close": pr. chiudo, chiudi, chiude, chiudiamo, chiudete, chiudono; ps.p. ho chiuso ; impf. chiudevo; ps.r. chiusi , chiudesti; f. chiuderò; sg.pr. che chiuda, che chiudiamo; sg.impf. che chiudessi; imp. chiudi!, chiuda!, chiudiamo!, chiudete!; pt.pr. chiudente;
 concedere  "to grant, to allow": pr. concedo , concedi, concede, concediamo, concedete, concedono; ps.p. ho concesso ; impf. concedevo; ps.r. concessi/concedei/concedetti, concedesti; f. concederò; sg.pr. che conceda, che concediamo; sg.impf. che concedessi; imp. concedi!, conceda!, concediamo!, concedete!; pt.pr. concedente;
 condurre  "to lead": pr. conduco, conduci, conduce, conduciamo, conducete, conducono; ps.p. ho condotto ; impf. conducevo; ps.r. condussi, conducesti; f. condurrò; sg.pr. che conduca, che conduciamo; sg.impf. che conducessi; imp. conduci!, conduca!, conduciamo!, conducete!; pt.pr. conducente;
 crescere  "to grow (up)": pr. cresco , cresci , cresce, cresciamo, crescete, crescono; ps.p. sono cresciuto/-a; impf. crescevo; ps.r. crebbi , crescesti; f. crescerò; sg.pr. che cresca, che cresciamo; sg.impf. che crescessi; imp. cresci!, cresca!, cresciamo!, crescete!; pt.pr. crescente;
 cuocere  "to cook": pr. cuocio , cuoci, cuoce, cuociamo/cociamo, cuocete/cocete, cuociono; ps.p. ho cotto ; impf. cuocevo/cocevo; ps.r. cossi , cuocesti/cocesti; f. cuocerò/cocerò; sg.pr. che cuocia, che cuociamo/cociamo; sg.impf. che cuocessi/cocessi; imp. cuoci!, cuocia!, cuociamo/cociamo!, cuocete/cocete!; pt.pr. cuocente/cocente;
 dire  "to say": pr. dico, dici, dice, diciamo, dite, dicono;  ps.p. ho detto; impf. dicevo; ps.r. dissi, dicesti; f. dirò; sg.pr. dica, diciamo; sg.impf. dicessi; imp. di'!, dica!, diciamo!, dite!; pt.pr. dicente;
 dirigere  "to direct": pr. dirigo, dirigi, dirige, dirigiamo, dirigete, dirigono; ps.p. ho diretto ; impf. dirigevo; ps.r. diressi , dirigesti; f. dirigerò; sg.pr. che diriga, che dirigiamo; sg.impf. che dirigessi; imp. dirigi!, diriga!, dirigiamo!, dirigete!; pt.pr. dirigente;
 discutere  "to discuss": pr. discuto, discuti, discute, discutiamo, discutete, discutono; ps.p. ho discusso; impf. discutevo; ps.r. discussi, discutesti; f. discuterò; sg.pr. che discuta, che discutiamo; sg.impf. che discutessi; imp. discuti!, duscuta!, discutiamo!, discutete!; pt.pr. discutente;
 dolere  "to ache": pr. dolgo , duoli , duole, doliamo/dogliamo, dolete, dolgono; ps.p. sono doluto/-a; impf. dolevo; ps.r. dolsi , dolesti; f. dorrò; sg.pr. che dolga/doglia , che doliamo/dogliamo; sg.impf. che dolessi; imp. duoli!, dolga!, doliamo!, dolete!; pt.pr. dolente;
 dovere  "to have to": pr. devo/debbo , devi, deve, dobbiamo, dovete, devono/debbono; ps.p. ho dovuto; impf. dovevo; ps.r. dovei/dovetti, dovesti; f. dovrò; sg.pr. che debba, che dobbiamo; sg.impf. che dovessi; imp. devi!, debba!, dobbiamo!, dovete!; pt.pr. dovente;
 esigere  "to demand": pr. esigo, esigi, esige, esigiamo, esigete, esigono; ps.p. ho esatto; impf. esigevo; ps.r. esigei/esigetti, esigesti; f. esigerò; sg.pr. che esiga, che esigiamo; sg.impf. che esigessi; imp. esigi!, esiga!, esigiamo!, esigete!; pt.pr. esigente;
 espellere  "to expel": pr. espello , espelli, espelle, espelliamo, espellete, espellono; ps.p. ho espulso; impf. espellevo; ps.r. espulsi, espellesti; f. espellerò; sg.pr. che espella, che espelliamo; sg.impf. che espellessi; imp. espelli!, espella!, espelliamo!, espellete!; pt.pr. espellente;
 esprimere  "to express": pr. esprimo, esprimi, esprime, esprimiamo, esprimete, esprimono; ps.p. ho espresso ; impf. esprimevo; ps.r. espressi , esprimesti; f. esprimerò; sg.pr. che esprima, che esprimiamo; sg.impf. che esprimessi; imp. esprimi!, esprima!, esprimiamo!, esprimete!; pt.pr. esprimente;
 evolvere  "to evolve": pr. evolvo , evolvi, evolve, evolviamo, evolvete, evolvono; ps.p. sono evoluto/-a; impf. evolvevo; ps.r. evolvei/evolvetti, evolvesti; f. evolverò; sg.pr. che evolva, che evolviamo; sg.impf. che evolvessi; imp. evolvi!, evolva!, evolviamo!, evolvete!; pt.pr. evolvente;
 fondere  "to melt": pr. fondo , fondi, fonde, fondiamo, fondete, fondono; ps.p. ho fuso ; impf. fondevo; ps.r. fusi , fondesti; f. fonderò; sg.pr. che fonda, che fondiamo; sg.impf. che fondessi; imp. fondi!, fonda!, fondiamo!, fondete!; pt.pr. fondente;
 godere  "to enjoy": pr. godo , godi, gode, godiamo, godete, godono; ps.p. ho goduto; impf. godevo; ps.r. godei/godetti, godesti; f. godrò; sg.pr. che goda, che godiamo; sg.impf. che godessi; imp. godi!, goda!, godiamo!, godete!; pt.pr. godente;
 leggere  "to read": pr. leggo , leggi , legge, leggiamo, leggete, leggono; ps.p. ho letto ; impf. leggevo; ps.r. lessi , leggesti; f. leggerò; sg.pr. che legga, che leggiamo; sg.impf. che leggessi; imp. leggi!, legga!, leggiamo!, leggete!; pt.pr. leggente;
 mettere  "to put, to set": pr. metto , metti, mette, mettiamo, mettete, mettono; ps.p. ho messo ; impf. mettevo; ps.r. misi , mettesti; f. metterò; sg.pr. che metta, che mettiamo; sg.impf. che mettessi; imp. metti!, metta!, mettiamo!, mettete!; pt.pr. mettente;
 muovere  "to move sth": pr. muovo , muovi, muove, muoviamo/moviamo, muovete/movete, muovono; ps.p. ho mosso ; impf. muovevo/movevo; ps.r. mossi , muovesti/movesti; f. muoverò/moverò; sg.pr. che muova, che muoviamo/moviamo; sg.impf. che muovessi/movessi; imp. muovi!, muova!, muoviamo/moviamo!, muovete/movete!; pt.pr. muovente/movente;
 nascere  "to be born": pr. nasco, nasci, nasce, nasciamo, nascete, nascono; ps.p. sono nato/-a; impf. nascevo; ps.r. nacqui , nascesti; f. nascerò; sg.pr. che nasca, che nasciamo; sg.impf. che nascessi; imp. nasci!, nasca!, nasciamo!, nascete!; pt.pr. nascente;
 nascondere  "to hide": pr. nascondo , nascondi, nasconde, nascondiamo, nascondete, nascondono; ps.p. ho nascosto ; impf. nascondevo; ps.r. nascosi , nascondesti; f. nasconderò; sg.pr. che nasconda, che nascondiamo; sg.impf. che nascondessi; imp. nascondi!, nasconda!, nascondiamo!, nascondete!; pt.pr. nascondente;
 nuocere  "to harm": pr. nuoccio/noccio , nuoci , nuoce, nuociamo/nociamo, nuocete/nocete, nuocciono/nocciono; ps.p. ho nuociuto/nociuto; impf. nuocevo/nocevo; ps.r. nocqui , nuocesti/nocesti; f. nuocerò/nocerò; sg.pr. che nuoccia/noccia, che nuociamo/nociamo; sg.impf. che nuocessi/nocessi; imp. nuoci!, nuoccia/noccia!, nociamo/nuociamo!, nuocete/nocete!; pt.pr. nuocente/nocente;
 offrire  "to offer": pr. offro , offri, offre, offriamo, offrite, offrono; ps.p. ho offerto ; impf. offrivo; ps.r. offrii/offersi , offristi; f. offrirò; sg.pr. che offra, che offriamo; sg.impf. che offrissi; imp. offri!, offra!, offriamo!, offrite!; pt.pr. offerente;
 parere  "to seem": pr. paio , pari, pare, paiamo, parete, paiono; ps.p. sono parso/-a; impf. parevo; ps.r. parvi, paresti; f. parrò; sg.pr. che paia, che paiamo; sg.impf. che paressi; no imp.; pt.pr. parvente;
 piacere  "to be liked": pr. piaccio, piaci, piace, piacciamo, piacete, piacciono; ps.p. sono piaciuto/-a; impf. piacevo; ps.r. piacqui , piacesti; f. piacerò; sg.pr. che piaccia, che piacciamo; sg.impf. che piacessi; imp. piaci!, piaccia!, piacciamo!, piacete!; pt.pr. piacente;
 piangere  "to weep, to cry": pr. piango, piangi, piange, piangiamo, piangete, piangono; ps.p. ho pianto; impf. piangevo; ps.r. piansi, piangesti; f. piangerò; sg.pr. che pianga, che piangiamo; sg.impf. che piangessi; imp. piangi!, pianga!, piangiamo!, piangete!; pt.pr. piangente;
 porgere  "to extend, to hand": pr. porgo , porgi , porge, porgiamo, porgete, porgono; ps.p. ho porto ; impf. porgevo; ps.r. porsi , porgesti; f. porgerò; sg.pr. che porga, che porgiamo; sg.impf. che porgessi; imp. porgi!, porga!, porgiamo!, porgete!; pt.pr. porgente;
 porre  "to put": pr. pongo , poni , pone, poniamo, ponete, pongono;  ps.p. ho posto ; impf. ponevo; ps.r. posi , ponesti; f. porrò; sg.pr. che ponga, che poniamo; sg.impf. che ponessi; imp. poni!, ponga!, poniamo!, ponete!; pt.pr. ponente;
 potere  "to be able (to)": pr. posso , puoi , può, possiamo, potete, possono;  ps.p. ho potuto; impf. potevo; ps.r. potei, potesti; f. potrò; sg.pr. che possa, che possiamo; sg.impf. che potessi; imp. possi!, possa!, possiamo!, possiate!; pt.pr. potente;
 prendere  "to take": pr. prendo , prendi, prende, prendiamo, prendete, prendono; ps.p. ho preso ; impf. prendevo; ps.r. presi, prendesti; f. prenderò; sg.pr. che prenda, che prendiamo; sg.impf. che prendessi; imp. prendi!, prenda!, prendiamo!, prendete!; pt.pr. prendente;
 redimere  "to redeem": pr. redimo, redimi, redime, redimiamo, redimete, redimono; ps.p. ho redento ; impf. redimevo; ps.r. redensi , redimesti; f. redimerò; sg.pr. che redima, che redimiamo; sg.impf. che redimessi; imp. redimi!, redima!, redimiamo!, redimete!; pt.pr. redimente;
 rimanere  "to stay, to remain": pr. rimango, rimani, rimane, rimaniamo, rimanete, rimangono; ps.p. sono rimasto/-a; impf. rimanevo; ps.r. rimasi, rimanesti; f. rimarrò; sg.pr. che rimanga, che rimaniamo; sg.impf. che rimanessi; imp. rimani!, rimanga!, rimaniamo, rimanete!; pt.pr. rimanente;
 risolvere  "to solve": pr. risolvo , risolvi, risolve, risolviamo, risolvete, risolvono; ps.p. ho risolto ; impf. risolvevo; ps.r. risolsi , risolvesti; f. risolverò; sg.pr. che risolva, che risolviamo; sg.impf. che risolvessi; imp. risolvi!, risolva!, risolviamo!, risolvete!; pt.pr. risolvente;
 rompere  "to break (down)": pr. rompo , rompi, rompe, rompiamo, rompete, rompono; ps.p. ho rotto ; impf. rompevo; ps.r. ruppi, rompesti; f. romperò; sg.pr. che rompa, che rompiamo; sg.impf. che rompessi; imp. rompi!, rompa!, rompiamo!, rompete!; pt.pr. rompente;
 salire  "to go up": pr. salgo, sali, sale, saliamo, salite, salgono; ps.p. sono salito/-a; impf. salivo; ps.r. salii, salisti; f. salirò; sg.pr. che salga, che saliamo; sg.impf. che salissi; imp. sali!, salga!, saliamo!, salite!; pt.pr. salente;
 sapere  "to know": pr. so , sai, sa, sappiamo, sapete, sanno;  ps.p. ho saputo; impf. sapevo; ps.r. seppi , sapesti; f. saprò; sg.pr. che sappia, che sappiamo; sg.impf. che sapessi; imp. sappi!, sappia!, sappiamo!, sappiate!; pt.pr. sapente;
 scindere  "to divide, to sunder": pr. scindo, scindi, scinde, scindiamo, scindete, scindono; ps.p. ho scisso; impf. scindevo; ps.r. scissi, scindesti; f. scinderò; sg.pr. che scina, che scindiamo; sg.impf. che scindessi; imp. scindi!, scinda!, scindiamo!, scindete!; pt.pr. scindente;
 scrivere  "to write": pr. scrivo, scrivi, scrive, scriviamo, scrivete, scrivono; ps.p. ho scritto; impf. scrivevo; ps.r. scrissi, scrivesti; f. scriverò; sg.pr. che scriva, che scriviamo; sg.impf. che scrivessi; imp. scrivi!, scriva!, scriviamo!, scrivete!; pt.pr. scrivente;
 scuotere  "to shake": pr. scuoto , scuoti, scuote, scuotiamo/scotiamo, scuotete/scotete, scuotono; ps.p. ho scosso ; impf. scuotevo/scotevo; ps.r. scossi , scuotesti/scotesti; f. scuoterò/scoterò; sg.pr. che scuota, che scuotiamo/scotiamo; sg.impf. che scuotessi/scotessi; imp. scuoti!, scuota!, scuotiamo/scotiamo!, scuotete/scotete!; pt.pr. scuotente/scotente;
 sedere  "to sit": pr. siedo , siedi, siede, sediamo, sedete, siedono; ps.p. sono seduto/-a; impf. sedevo; ps.r. sedei/sedetti, sedesti; f. siederò/sederò; sg.pr. che sieda, che sediamo; sg.impf. che sedessi; imp. siedi!, sieda!, sediamo!, sedete!; pt.pr. sedente;
 spegnere  "to turn off, to switch off": pr. spengo , spegni , spegne, spegniamo, spegnete, spengono; ps.p. ho spento ; impf. spegnevo; ps.r. spensi , spegnesti; f. spegnerò; sg.pr. che spenga, che spegniamo; sg.impf. che spegnessi; imp. spegni!, spenga!, spegniamo!, spegnete!; pt.pr. spegnente;
 svellere  "to eradicate": pr. svello/svelgo , svelli, svelle, svelliamo, svellete, svellono/svelgono; ps.p. ho svelto ; impf. svellevo; ps.r. svelsi , svellesti; f. svellerò; sg.pr. che svella/svelga, che svelliamo; sg.impf. che svellessi; imp. svelli!, svella/svelga!, svelliamo!, svellete!; pt.pr. svellente;
 tenere  "to hold, to keep": pr. tengo , tieni , tiene, teniamo, tenete, tengono; ps.p. ho tenuto; impf. tenevo; ps.r. tenni , tenesti; f. terrò; sg.pr. che tenga, che teniamo; sg.impf. che tenesse; imp. tieni!, tenga!, teniamo!, tenete!; pt.pr. tenente;
 togliere  "to remove": pr. tolgo , togli , toglie, togliamo, togliete, tolgono; ps.p. ho tolto ; impf. toglievo; ps.r. tolsi , togliesti; f. toglierò; sg.pr. che tolga, che togliamo; sg.impf. che togliessi; imp. togli!, tolga!, togliamo!, togliete!; pt.pr. togliente;
 trarre  "to draw, to pull": pr. traggo, trai, trae, traiamo, traete, traggono; ps.p. ho tratto; impf. traevo; ps.r. trassi, traesti; f. trarrò; sg.pr. che tragga, che traiamo; sg.impf. che traessi; imp. trai!, tragga!, traiamo!, traete!; pt.pr. traente;
 udire  "to hear": pr. odo , odi, ode, udiamo, udite, odono; ps.p. ho udito; impf. udivo; ps.r. udii, udisti; f. udrò/udirò; sg.pr. che oda, che udiamo; sg.impf. che udissi; imp. odi!, oda!, udiamo!, udite!; pt.pr. udente;
 uscire  "to go out": pr. esco , esci , esce, usciamo, uscite, escono; ps.p. sono uscito/-a; impf. uscivo; ps.r. uscii, uscisti; f. uscirò; sg.pr. che esca, che usciamo; sg.impf. che uscissi; imp. esci!, esca!, usciamo!, uscite!; pt.pr. uscente;
 valere  "to be worth": pr. valgo, vali, vale, valiamo, valete, valgono; ps.p. sono valso/-a; impf. valevo; ps.r. valsi, valesti; f. varrò; sg.pr. che valga, che valiamo; sg.impf. che valessi; imp. vali!, valga!, valiamo!, valete!; pt.pr. valente;
 vedere  "to see": pr. vedo , vedi, vede, vediamo, vedete, vedono; ps.p. ho visto; impf. vedevo; ps.r. vidi, vedesti; f. vedrò; sg.pr. che veda, che vediamo; sg.impf. che vedessi; imp. vedi!, veda!, vediamo!, vedete!; pt.pr. vedente;
 venire  "to come": pr. vengo , vieni , viene, veniamo, venite, vengono;  ps.p. sono venuto/-a; impf. venivo; ps.r. venni , venisti; f. verrò; sg.pr. che venga, che veniamo; sg.impf. che venisse; imp. vieni!, venga!, veniamo!, venite!; pt.pr. venente;
 vivere  "to live": pr. vivo, vivi, vive, viviamo, vivete, vivono; ps.p. sono vissuto/-a, ho vissuto; impf. vivevo; ps.r. vissi, vivesti; f. vivrò; sg.pr. che viva, che viviamo; sg.impf. che vivessi; imp. vivi!, viva!, viviamo!, vivete!; pt.pr. vivente;
 volere  "to want (to)": pr. voglio , vuoi , vuole, vogliamo, volete, vogliono; ps.p. ho voluto; impf. volevo; ps.r. volli , volesti; f. vorrò; sg.pr. che voglia, che vogliamo; sg.impf. che volessi; imp. vogli!, voglia!, vogliamo!, vogliate!; pt.pr. volente;
 see all the other Italian irregular verbs in English Wiktionary and in Italian Wikipedia.

Notes

Bibliography

External links 
 Italian conjugations - Find conjugated verbs
 verbi-italiani.info - Italian verb conjugations and online exercises
 Italian verb conjugator  - Conjugate Italian verbs

Italian grammar
Indo-European verbs